Club Deportivo Piedrabuena is a Spanish football team  based in Piedrabuena, in Ciudad Real in the autonomous community of Castile-La Mancha. Founded in 1981, its plays in 1ª Autonómica Preferente. The stadium is Estadio El Olivar with capacity of 1,500 seats.

Season to season

8 seasons in Tercera División

External links
ffcm.es profile
Futbolme.com profile

Football clubs in Castilla–La Mancha
Association football clubs established in 1981
Divisiones Regionales de Fútbol clubs
1981 establishments in Spain
Province of Ciudad Real